State Route 243 (SR 243) is a primary state highway in the U.S. state of Virginia. Known as Nutley Street, the state highway runs  from U.S. Route 29 (US 29) and State Route 237 (SR 237) on the border between Oakton and Merrifield north to State Route 123 (SR 123) in Vienna. SR 243 connects Vienna and Fairfax with Interstate 66 (I-66) and the Vienna station of the Washington Metro.

Route description

SR 243 begins at an intersection with US 29 and SR 237 (Lee Highway) between the independent city of Fairfax and the community of Merrifield. Nutley Street continues south  as a two-lane undivided road designated SR 10272 to US 50 (Arlington Boulevard). SR 243 heads north as a six-lane divided highway through a cloverleaf interchange with I-66 just east of the Vienna station of the Washington Metro, which is the western terminus of the Orange Line that runs in the median of the Interstate from Vienna east to Arlington. Access to the station is provided by the first intersection on either side of the I-66 interchange. SR 243 continues into the town of Vienna as a four-lane divided boulevard that passes between residential neighborhoods before reaching its northern terminus at SR 123 (Maple Avenue) southwest of downtown Vienna. Nutley Street continues north as a two-lane residential street for four blocks to Malcolm Road.

Major intersections

References

External links

Virginia Highways Project: VA 243

243
State Route 243